Pyrrhidivalva is a monotypic moth genus of the family Noctuidae erected by Shigero Sugi. Its only species, Pyrrhidivalva sordida, was first described by Arthur Gardiner Butler in 1881. It is found in Amurland, Ussuri, Korea, Japan and Taiwan.

References

Hadeninae
Monotypic moth genera